Years of potential life lost (YPLL) or potential years of life lost (PYLL), is an estimate of the average years a person would have lived if they had not died prematurely. It is, therefore, a measure of premature mortality. As an alternative to death rates, it is a method that gives more weight to deaths that occur among younger people. An alternative is to consider the effects of both disability and premature death using disability adjusted life years.

Calculation 

To calculate the years of potential life lost, the analyst has to set an upper reference age. The reference age should correspond roughly to the life expectancy of the population under study. In the developed world, this is commonly set at age 75, but it is essentially arbitrary. Thus, PYLL should be written with respect to the reference age used in the calculation: e.g., PYLL[75].

PYLL can be calculated using individual level data or using age grouped data.

Briefly, for the individual method, each person's PYLL is calculated by subtracting the person's age at death from the reference age. If a person is older than the reference age when they die, that person's PYLL is set to zero (i.e., there are no "negative" PYLLs). In effect, only those who die before the reference age are included in the calculation. Some examples:

 Reference age = 75; Age at death = 60; PYLL[75] = 75 − 60 = 15
 Reference age = 75; Age at death = 6 months; PYLL[75] = 75 − 0.5 = 74.5
 Reference age = 75; Age at death = 80; PYLL[75] = 0 (age at death greater than reference age)

To calculate the PYLL for a particular population in a particular year, the analyst sums the individual PYLLs for all individuals in that population who died in that year. This can be done for all-cause mortality or for cause-specific mortality.

Significance 

In the developed world, mortality counts and rates tend to emphasise the most common causes of death in older people because the risk of death increases with age. Because YPLL gives more weight to deaths among younger people, it is the favoured metric among those who wish to draw attention to those causes of death that are more common in younger people. Some researchers say that this measurement should be considered by governments when they decide how best to divide up scarce resources for research.

For example, in most of the developed world, heart disease and cancer are the leading causes of death, as measured by the number (or rate) of deaths. For this reason, heart disease and cancer tend to get a lot of attention (and research funding). However, one might argue that everyone has to die of something eventually, and so public health efforts should be more explicitly directed at preventing premature death. When PYLL is used as an explicit measure of premature death, then injuries and infectious diseases, become more important. While the most common cause of death of young people aged 5 to 40 is injury and poisoning in the developed world, because relatively few young people die, the principal causes of lost years remain cardiovascular disease and cancer.

By main cause of death in the United States of America 

A study suggests the global "mean loss of life expectancy" (LLE) from all forms of direct violence was about 0.3 years, while air pollution accounted for about 2.9 years in 2015.

By country

Here is a table of YPLL for all causes (ages 0–69, per 100,000) with the most recent available data from the OECD:

Australia
The report of the NSW Chief Medical Officer in 2002 indicates that cardiovascular disease (32.7% (of total Males Years of Life Lost due to premature mortality) and 36.6% of females YLL) and malignant neoplasms (27.5% of Males YLL and 31.2% of Females YLL) are the main causes of lost years 

When disability adjusted life years are considered, cancer (25.1/1,000), cardiovascular disease (23.8/1,000), mental health issues (17.6/1,000), neurological disorders (15.7/1,000), chronic respiratory disease (9.4/1,000) and diabetes (7.2/1,000) are the main causes of good years of expected life lost to disease or premature death. The dramatic difference is in the greater number of years of disability caused mental illness and neurological issues and by diabetes.

See also 
 Life-years lost (duplicate?)
 Disability-adjusted life year
 Quality-adjusted life year

References

Actuarial science
Death
Health policy
Epidemiology